Centro de Estudios Carlos Marx (Karl Marx Study Centre) was a left-wing group in Argentina. The Centre was founded in 1912 by a dissident group within the Socialist Party. This was the first organized expression of opposition to the reformist leadership of the party. The Centre published Palabra Socialista.

References

Defunct political parties in Argentina
Political parties established in 1912
1912 establishments in Argentina
Political parties with year of disestablishment missing